The 1960–61 NBA season was the 15th season of the National Basketball Association.  The season ended with the Boston Celtics winning their 3rd straight NBA title, beating the St. Louis Hawks 4 games to 1 in the NBA Finals.

Notable occurrences 
 The Lakers relocate from Minneapolis, Minnesota to Los Angeles. They would play for seven seasons in the Los Angeles Memorial Sports Arena.
 The NBA schedule expanded again, this time from 75 games per team to 79.
 The 1961 NBA All-Star Game was played in Syracuse, New York, with the West beating the East 153–131.  Rookie Oscar Robertson of the Cincinnati Royals won the game's MVP award.

Final standings

Eastern Division

Western Division

x – clinched playoff spot

Playoffs

Statistics leaders

Note: Prior to the 1969–70 season, league leaders in points, rebounds, and assists were determined by totals rather than averages.

NBA awards
Most Valuable Player: Bill Russell, Boston Celtics
Rookie of the Year: Oscar Robertson, Cincinnati Royals

All-NBA First Team:
F – Elgin Baylor, Los Angeles Lakers
F – Bob Pettit, St. Louis Hawks
C – Wilt Chamberlain, Philadelphia Warriors
G – Bob Cousy, Boston Celtics
G – Oscar Robertson, Cincinnati Royals

All-NBA Second Team:
F – Tom Heinsohn, Boston Celtics
F – Dolph Schayes, Syracuse Nationals
C – Bill Russell, Boston Celtics
G – Larry Costello, Syracuse Nationals
G – Gene Shue, Detroit Pistons

References
1960–61 NBA Season Summary basketball-reference.com. Retrieved March 30, 2010.